Victorio Nicolás Cocco  (born 23 March 1946 in Santa Fe, Argentina) is a former Argentine footballer. He played for a number of clubs in Argentina, Spain and Colombia and represented the Argentina national football team.

Personal life 

Three marriages.  Four children.  Two from first marriage: Victorio Jr and Verónica, one from his second marriage: Victoria and another from his third marriage, Aaron.

Playing career

Cocco made his professional debut playing for Unión de Santa Fe in the Argentine 2nd division in 1964. He was part of the team that won the championship and promotion to the Primera in 1966. Cocco played one season with Unión in the Primera in 1967.

Cocco was signed by San Lorenzo in 1968 and later that year he won his first Primera Division title with the club. San Lorenzo won the Metropolitano without losing a single game, making them the first unbeaten champions in the professional era of Argentine football.

In 1972 Cocco was part of the San Lorenzo team that won both of the Argentine league titles, this time they completed the Nacional championship without losing a game.

Cocco won his fourth title with San Lorenzo in 1974, the club won the Nacional championship. Cocco is one of only five players to have won four league championships with San Lorenzo, the others being Sergio Villar, Carlos Veglio, Roberto Telch and Agustín Irusta.

By the time Cocco left San Lorenzo in 1974 he had played 202 games for the club, scoring 49 goals.

In 1975 Cocco played for Deportivo La Coruña in Spain, but he returned to Argentina in 1976 to play for River Plate. In 1977, he joined Club Atlético Atlanta where he got his first taste of management as a player manager in the last few games of the Metropolitano 1977.

Cocco had a short spell with Boca Juniors in 1978 alongside former San Lorenzo team-mate Carlos Veglio. He made 12 appearances for the club, and joined the select band of players to have played for Boca Juniors and River Plate.

Cocco played out his career in Colombia with Cúcuta Deportivo in 1979.

Titles as a player

Managerial career 

Cocco has held a number of managerial positions including San Lorenzo (twice), Atlanta (3 times), Belgrano de Córdoba (twice), Racing de Córdoba, Colón de Santa Fe, Club Atlético Tigre and Gimnasia y Tiro de Salta. He has also held a number of other official positions in Argentine football.

References

External links

 Museo de San Lorenzo website
 Once-onze.narod.ru
 Professional CV

1946 births
Living people
Footballers from Santa Fe, Argentina
Argentine footballers
Association football midfielders
Unión de Santa Fe footballers
San Lorenzo de Almagro footballers
Deportivo de La Coruña players
Club Atlético River Plate footballers
Club Atlético Atlanta footballers
Racing de Córdoba footballers
Boca Juniors footballers
Argentine Primera División players
Primera Nacional players
Argentine expatriate footballers
Expatriate footballers in Colombia
Expatriate footballers in Spain
Argentina international footballers
Argentine football managers
Club Atlético Atlanta managers
San Lorenzo de Almagro managers
Club Atlético Belgrano managers
Club Atlético Colón managers
Club Atlético Tigre managers
Argentine people of Italian descent